Games Distillery was a Slovak video game developer based in Bratislava. It was founded by members of defunct company 10tacle Studios Slovakia that worked on a cancelled game Elveon.

History 
The studio was founded in August 2008. Its first project was Aqua. The game was announced during Leipzig Games Convention 2008. The game was released in May 2010.

The studio then worked on two unannounced projects that were to be introduced around Electronic Entertainment Expo 2010.

In November 2012 the studio announced its new project, Citadels. The game was released in July 2013 to very negative reviews. Games Distillery then worked on patches for the game until September when BigMoon Studios took over the works.

Games

References 

Defunct video game companies of Slovakia
Video game companies established in 2008
Video game development companies
Slovakian companies established in 2008
Video game companies disestablished in 2013
2013 disestablishments in Slovakia
2013 mergers and acquisitions